The Crucifix Carver of Ammergau is a 1952 West German romantic drama film directed by Harald Reinl and starring Erich Auer, Elise Aulinger and Willy Rösner. Part of the tradition of heimatfilm, it was based on the 1880 play of the same name by Ludwig Ganghofer. It was made at the Bavaria Studios in Munich and on location in the Bavarian Alps. The film's sets were designed by the art director Max Seefelder.

Plot
A rural wood carver is invited by a painter to come to Munich to study art, leading to tensions with his girlfriend.

Cast

References

External links

1952 romantic drama films
German romantic drama films
West German films
Films directed by Harald Reinl
Films based on works by Ludwig Ganghofer
German films based on plays
Films set in Bavaria
Films set in the Alps
German black-and-white films
Films shot at Bavaria Studios
1950s German-language films
1950s German films